Two Weeks is a 2006 American comedy-drama film written and directed by Steve Stockman and starring Sally Field. It came out in theaters on March 2, 2007, in select theaters, and was released on DVD on September 18, 2007. However, it was screened at the Hamptons International Film Festival on October 20, 2006, and is often cited as a 2006 film.

Premise
Four siblings return home to their mother's house, in North Carolina, for what they think are the last few days of her life. Suddenly, this unexpected family reunion extends uncomfortably as she hangs on, and they find themselves trapped together for two weeks, forced to face her death and also their connection with each other.

Cast
 Sally Field as Anita Bergman
 Ben Chaplin as Keith Bergman
 Thomas Cavanagh as Barry Bergman
 Julianne Nicholson as Emily Bergman
 Glenn Howerton as Matthew Bergman
 Clea DuVall as Katrina
 James Murtaugh as Jim Cranston
 Michael Hyatt as Carol
 Susan Misner as Sherry
 Jenny O'Hara as Julia

Reception
Rotten Tomatoes gives the film a 19% approval rating based on 26 reviews, with an average rating of 4.4/10. The site's critics consensus reads: "Sally Field gives it her all, but this excessively maudlin family drama feels like it takes Two Weeks to finish."

References

External links
 
 
 
 

2006 films
2006 comedy-drama films
Metro-Goldwyn-Mayer films
American comedy-drama films
Films scored by Heitor Pereira
2000s English-language films
2000s American films